Jan Jaap van der Wal (born 1 November 1979) is a Dutch stand-up comedian, cabaret performer and television presenter.

Television

He is known as team captain in Dit was het nieuws, the Dutch adaptation of the BBC show Have I Got News for You, and as one of the jury members of the Belgian quiz show De Slimste Mens ter Wereld. 

He had permanent appearances in the talk shows RTL Late Night and Café Corsari.

Van der Wal lives in Belgium and he has presented De Nieuwe Belg and the satirical news show De ideale wereld there.

Cabaret
He is a cabaratier in the Netherlands and Belgium.

Personal life 

Van der Wal and actress Eva Duijvestein have a son.

He has a cleft lip.

Filmography 

 College Tour (2007)
 5 jaar later (2014)

References

External links 

 

1979 births
Living people
Dutch cabaret performers
Dutch expatriates in Belgium
Dutch stand-up comedians
Dutch television presenters
People from Leeuwarden